This article lists those who were potential candidates for the Republican nomination for Vice President of the United States in the 1996 election. Former Kansas Senator Bob Dole won the 1996 Republican nomination for President of the United States, and chose former Secretary of Housing and Urban Development Jack Kemp as his running mate. Dole chose Kemp as his running mate in order to solidify support among the conservative wing of the Republican Party, despite the mutual personal distaste the two candidates had for each other. The Dole–Kemp ticket would lose the 1996 election to the Clinton–Gore ticket.

Shortlist

Other potential candidates

Members of Congress

Governors 
Federal executive branch officials

Other Individuals

See also
Bob Dole 1996 presidential campaign
1996 Republican Party presidential primaries
1996 Republican National Convention
1996 United States presidential election
List of United States major party presidential tickets

References

Vice presidency of the United States
1996 United States presidential election